Martin Fischer and Philipp Oswald were the defending champions, but Fischer chose not to participate this year.
As a result, Oswald played alongside Nikolaus Moser. They reached the quarterfinals, but lost to Andrey Kumantsov and Michael Ryderstedt.
Dominik Meffert and Simon Stadler won the title after defeating Andre Begemann and James Lemke 7–5, 2–6, [10–7].

Seeds

Draw

Draw

References
 Doubles Draw
 Qualifying Doubles Draw

All Japan Indoor Tennis Championships - Doubles
2011 Doubles